Park Sun-young (born May 30, 1989), known professionally as Hyomin, is a South Korean singer, songwriter, actress, fashion designer known for her work as a member of South Korean girl group T-ara, which went on to become one of the best-selling girl groups of all time and one of South Korea's most popular girl groups worldwide. Apart from her group's activities, Hyomin has also starred in various television dramas such as My Girlfriend is a Nine-Tailed Fox (2010), Gyebaek (2011), The Thousandth Man (2012), and in various films such as Gisaeng Ryung (2011) and Jinx!!! (2013). She debuted as a solo artist with her debut EP, Make Up, on June 30, 2014 with the lead track "Nice Body" which earned her 3 nominations at Seoul Music Awards. She, since then, released 2 mini-albums: Sketch (2016) and Allure (2019). In 2019, Hyomin released the digital single "Cabinet" with JustaTee. The song achieved worldwide success mainly in Vietnam where it topped both multi-national platform VLive and Vietnamese streaming platform Nhaccuatui's digital chart for weeks. The song ended up winning 4 awards at the VLive Awards.

Known for her direct involvement with project-making, including songwriting, production, styling and design, Hyomin is credited for her contribution to the Korean wave's international spread. She's also recognized as a style icon in the fashion industry and considered "one of the leading fashionistas", as KBS describes her, by multiple experts in the field. In 2019, Hyomin launched a self-produced make-up brand named MINITT which was followed by a clothing line "SAY NO MORE" in 2021.

Career

1989–2011: Early life and career beginnings
Hyomin was born Park Sun-young on May 30, 1989, in Busan, South Korea, an only child. In 1997, she won the MiMi Princess modeling contest, and became a well-known internet ulzzang before debuting with T-ara. She was a trainee under JYP Entertainment and was considered to be a replacement for Hyuna, who was a member of the Wonder Girls in 2007. Hyomin debuted in 2009 as a member of T-ara, which made their debut stage on July 30 on the music program M Countdown with their single "Lie". On June 14, 2011, Core Contents Media announced that Hyomin would take over leadership as T-ara's third leader for their comeback album, John Travolta Wannabe, and Japanese promotions. She later passed on her leadership to fellow member, Park So-yeon.

Hyomin was a fixed cast member of KBS' variety show Invincible Youth from October 23, 2009, to December 24, 2010. The show was well-received by both fans and critics earning an appreciation plaque from the Korean Ministry for Food, Agriculture, Forestry and Fisheries as well as a President's commendation from Korea Rural Community Cooperation  and a special award at the 16th Hongcheon WaxyCorn King Festival. In November 2009, she was cast in the musical production of I Really Really Like You, an adaption of the hit drama Love Truly.

She starred in the drama My Girlfriend is a Nine-Tailed Fox as Ban Sun-nyeo from August 11 to September 30, 2010. The drama achieved nationwide and then international success ranking in Top 10 most-watched dramas during its run. Hyomin made her major big screen debut in the horror film Gisaeng Ryung, which was released on August 4, 2011.

2012–2013: Acting career and T-ara N4

In 2012, Hyomin was cast in the musical "Our Youth Roly-Poly" along with group members Park Ji-yeon and Park So-yeon, a musical adaptation of T-ara's 2011 hit song "Roly Poly". Hyomin was also cast in the Chinese version of We Got Married, in which her partner is Fu Xinbo, a Chinese idol. On June 14, 2012, it was confirmed that Hyomin was cast in a supporting role in  MBC's fantasy sitcom The Thousandth Man.

On February 10, 2013, Hyomin was cast in a lead role in the Japanese film Jinx!!!, starring Kento Yamazaki and Kurumi Shimizu. which earned a special nomination at Tokyo International Film Festival and marked Hyomin's first appearnace at the said event.

In April 2013, Hyomin along with T-ara member Hahm Eun-jung, Park Ji-yeon and former member Areum formed a subgroup called T-ara N4, releasing their first mini-album titled Jeon Won Diary.

2014–present: Solo debut and label changes
On June 30, 2014, Hyomin released her first solo extended play Make Up with the lead single "Nice Body", the song was hit in and outside Korea peaking at number 1 on YinYueTai Korean Weekly Chart. Her second extended play Sketch with double title tracks "Sketch and "Gold" was released on March 17, 2016. The album earned Hyomin's first award at the YinYueTai V-Chart Awards for Best Female Artist, Korea.

In January 2018, Hyomin left MBK Entertainment after her contract ended. She intends to continue promoting with T-ara in the future.

In May 2018, Hyomin joined Sublime Artist Agency to pursue her solo career in South Korea and China.

On January 20, 2019, Hyomin released her second digital single titled "U Um U Um" ahead of her 3rd mini album expected to be released in mid-February.

On February 20, 2019, Hyomin released her third extended play Allure. The album's title track is also called "Allure". The album became Hyomin's second to reach 10,000 physical copies sold on Gaon Chart and her first to Top the Taiwanese album chart  while "Allure" (Song) became her 5th Number 1 hit on the Chinese platform YinYueTai's Weekly Korean chart, the most for any Korean female artist.

In May 2021, Hyomin left Sublime Artist Agency after her contract with them had expired.

Artistry 
Much like her own group's career, Hyomin's discography is known most for its versatility and creativity. She's been known to experiment with her music and album concepts while being directly involved with the overall production of her projects from songwriting to outfit and stage costume design.

Park's debut single "Nice Body" was described as a "bold choice of songs/concepts" by critics for its controversial music video which presented the perfect body measurements for females. Scott Interrante of PopMatters praised the music video's ability the bring attention to current beauty standards, "it may actually be trying to bring attention to the ridiculous standards we place on women and pop stars in our society". He also described the song as strong, fun, and summery. Hyomin was revealed to be a producer for the album participating in the production of its costumes, hair styling, packaging, choreography, music video, design, etc.

In 2018, Hyomin's third EP was revealed to be part of a "color project (literal translation). The first released single of the project was Mango (Yellow), proceeded by U Um U Um (Emerald green) and finally Allure (Red), the later became the lead single of the EP named Allure.

Public image and impact 
Recognized as a fashion expert, Hyomin has been praised for her unique style and fashion sense since her debut while her public appearances often become hot topics on social media. Kim Ji-il from The Korea Economic Daily wrote an article in 2012; "Rise of the new fashion icon", he named it, praising Park for her fashion sense after one of her published photos became a hot topic in South Korea. Kim highlighted the star's unique appearance, airport fashion and stage outfits. Vietnamese magazine Kenh14 selected Hyomin as one of the top Korean celebrities with the best style in 2013 praising her simple airport outfits and recognizing her as one of the idols with the best fashion style.

"The Fashion Icon" and "South Korea's Fashionista", as E-Times and Chosun Ilbo describe her, Park's influence has been praised and recognized by multiple local and international publications. Cho Seonghwa, an editor for Asia Time, called her "A certified fashionista" in 2013.

Since 2016, Hyomin has been regularly mentioned in Cosmopolitan's articles, often listing her fashion choices on different materials as an influence for readers. In May 2022, Hyomin's fashion style on her 1-month trip to Australia became a Cosmopolitan article in which she was described as "well-rounded". An editor of the magazine analyzed her trip's looks praising especially her casual wear.

Additionally, She has landed multiple covers and editorials of various fashion magazines in Korea and abroad, including for Allure, Cosmopolitan , Vogue, Marie Claire , #Legend (Hong Kong), GQ, Shanghai Entertainment (China), NYLON, Harper's Bazaar, InStyle, Dazed  and BNT International.

Hyomin has been a regular VIP guest at the Seoul Fashion Week since 2012 modeling for brands like "Beyond Closet", "YCH", "FleaMadonna" and "pushBUTTON". In addition, she often tops "The Best Dressed" lists on the show made by Fashion experts. In January 2016, Hyomin was praised by Allure Magazine for her Seoul Fashion Week styles highlighting her ability to "digest trendy items in a wearable look" 

Hyomin's influence extends beyond music into the fashion industry; hailed as "20s Wannabe Star", she is recognized as an influence for women in their 20s, especially for "bold" choices of clothes.

Writing for E-Times, Hwang Yeong-cheol praised Hyomin's presence in the fashion industry following her appearances at fashion-related events  In 2016, Hyomin received an invite to attend the menswear brand "Beyond Closet"'s pop-up launching show held at PMQ Shopping Mall in Hong Kong. About 50 celebrities in the beauty industry in Hong Kong, including designer Ko Tae-yong, participated in the event. Park was the only foreign celebrity to be invited to the event.

Park is also known to be directly involved with styling fashion design and critique. She revealed in an interview with Dazed that she chooses her own outfits in airports and on public appearances. She also directly decides on the concept, outfits and brands in her different pictorials and photoshoots.

Other ventures

Endorsements and promotions 
Hyomin modeled for various shopping malls and brands such as Japanese / American multinational convenience store 7-Eleven before her debut.

In 2017, Hyomin filmed a commercial for Adidas and also served as a "style runner" for the brand.

In 2018, Hyomin became a model for clothing brand GGPX forwhich T-ara modeled for in the past, she promoted the brand not only in Korea but also in Asia specifically in China due to her popularity in the country.

In 2020, Hyomin became the global muse for Asian cosmetic brand "Abib Global" which was sold mainly in parts of South East Asia and China. Several commercial films were released for the promotion campaign.

Since 2018, Hyomin has been working as an Instagram model/influencer, she has modeled for several A-List brands including Fendi, Levi's, Le Coq Sportif, car brand Lotus Evora among others.

Ambassadorships 
In 2011, Hyomin was chosen as Thailand's ambassador and judge for the one-billion idol audition program Global Super Idol. Hyomin attended the press conference for the program in Bangkok, Thailand on September 20, 2011.

In 2019, Hyomin was selected as the public relations ambassador for "South Korea's National Youth Day" and received an ambassador's certificate for her role, she was chosen as an ambassador again the following year,

Fashion design
During T-ara's "Roly-Poly" promotions in June 2011, Hyomin designed the stage costumes, flaunting a retro pattern and short shorts that were popular during the period.

Hyomin launched an exclusive clothing collection, in collaboration with celebrity stylist Kim Sung-il, for G-Market on June 4, 2012.

In May 2012, Hyomin became labelmate Gankiz's stylist and director for their debut. She spent 2 days looking for costumes matching their debut song HONEY HONEY. Hyomin previously became the group's official assistant photographer for their US$1 Billion debut project. She was also the narrator behind their debut reality show "9 Days 8 Nights In Europe".

In 2014, in celebration of her solo debut, Hyomin designed a special collection of T-shirts which were sold exclusively on T-ara's mobile app "T-ara Holic". The whole collection was sold out in less than 24 hours. Hyomin donated all profits to charities

On February 25, 2019, Hyomin launched an exclusive cosmetic brand "MINITT" in collaboration with VT Cosmetics. Hyomin participated in the entire production process from brand planning to product development. The brand name is a compound word of Hyomin's 'Min' and 'MINUTE', which means 'Fall in the charm of MINITT just for a moment'.

In September 2021, Hyomin launched her own clothing line named "SAY NO MORE". The brand had its first pop-up store in Seoul, South Korea on March 19, 2022. Hyomin was revealed to be the designer behind the brand.

Philanthropy 
In 2014, a self-designed collection of t-shirts made by Hyo-min was put on sale exclusive on T-ara's mobile app "T-ara Holic" to celebrate her solo debut. The whole collection was sold-out in less than 24 hours. Hyomin donated all profits to charities.

In January 2017, Hyomin participated in "Give Love" campaign, a charity event organized by "Save The Children Korea" organization. Hyomin donated several personal products.

In 2019, Hyomin donated relief supplies for the victims of Gangwon-do wildfire disaster.

In February 2020, Hyomin donated 3,000 masks to Daegu City citizens during the spread of COVID-19.

On March 8, 2022, Hyomin donated items to help the victims of the fire that started in Uljin, Gyeongbuk and has spread to Samcheok, Gangwon. Hyomin personally helped deliver the goods to charity organizations and people in need.

Discography

Extended Plays

 Make Up (2014)
 Sketch (2016)
 Allure (2019)

Filmography

Hosting

Musical

Concerts

Awards and nominations

Other recognitions

Listicles

References

External links

1989 births
K-pop singers
Living people
T-ara members
South Korean female idols
South Korean Roman Catholics
South Korean women pop singers
South Korean film actresses
South Korean television actresses
South Korean television personalities
People from Busan
Sungkyunkwan University alumni